Ashok Marg is a road located in Lucknow, Uttar Pradesh in India, that travels through Hazratganj and Nishatganj.

References

Roads in Lucknow